Stéphane Renault (born 1 March 1968) is a French badminton player. He competed in the men's singles tournament at the 1992 Summer Olympics.

References

1968 births
Living people
French male badminton players
Olympic badminton players of France
Badminton players at the 1992 Summer Olympics
Place of birth missing (living people)